Sugar Pine Peak is a officially unnamed summit located in the northern Northern Sierra Nevada, in the Plumas National Forest in California.

The summit rises to an elevation of about 4828+ feet (1472+ m) on the Yuba–Sierra county line.

The highest point in Yuba County is located near the summit that is in Sierra County, on Stanford mountain. The peak gets snowfall during the winter.

References

See also
 List of highest points in California by county

Mountains of the Sierra Nevada (United States)
Mountains of Sierra County, California
Mountains of Yuba County, California
Plumas National Forest
Mountains of Northern California